Taft County is in Yazd province, Iran. The capital of the county is the city of Taft. At the 2006 census, the county's population was 45,357 in 13,747 households. The following census in 2011 counted 45,145 people in 14,325 households. At the 2016 census, the county's population was 43,893 in 14,659 households.

Administrative divisions

The population history and structural changes of Taft County's administrative divisions over three consecutive censuses are shown in the following table. The latest census shows three districts, 10 rural districts, and two cities.

References

 

Counties of Yazd Province